Falkenberg is a town in Sweden.

Falkenberg, or Falckenberg Falkenbergs may also refer to:

Places

Germany
 Falkenberg/Elster, a town in the district Elbe-Elster, Brandenburg
 Falkenberg-Höhe, a municipal federation in the district of Märkisch-Oderland, Brandenburg
 Falkenberg, Märkisch-Oderland, a town in the district Märkisch-Oderland, Brandenburg
 Falkenberg (Berlin), a locality in the borough of Lichtenberg, Berlin
 Falkenberg, Lower Bavaria, a town in the district of Rottal-Inn in Bavaria
 Falkenberg (Lüneburg Heath), a hill on the Lüneburg Heath in Lower Saxony
 Falkenberg, Upper Palatinate, a town in the district of Tirschenreuth in Bavaria
 Falkenberg, Saxony-Anhalt, a town in the district of Stendal in Saxony-Anhalt
 Falkenberg, a place in Lilienthal, Lower Saxony 
 Falkenberg, a village in Wabern, Germany

Sweden
 Falkenberg Municipality, a municipality in Halland County 
Falkenberg, Sweden, a locality and the municipal seat of Falkenberg Municipality
 Falkenberg Bridge, a stone arch bridge spanning river Ätran
 Falkenberg (fort), a fort in Falkenberg
 Falkenbergs gymnasieskola, a secondary school
 Falkenberg railway, a former railway
 Falkenbergs IP, a football stadium
 Falkenbergs Motorbana, a motor racing circuit in Bergagård

Elsewhere
 Faulquemont, France, formerly in Alsace-Lorraine and known in German as Falkenberg
 Jastrzębniki, West Pomeranian Voivodeship, Poland, formerly in Pomerania and known in German as Falkenberg
 Monfalcone, Friuli-Venezia Giulia, Italy, formerly in the Province of Gorizia and known in German as Falkenberg
 Niemodlin, Poland, formerly in Silesia and known in German as Falkenberg
 Sokolec, Lower Silesian Voivodeship, Poland, formerly in Silesia and known in German as Falkenberg
 Sokolniki, Goleniów County, Poland, formerly in Pomerania and known in German as Falkenberg

Organisations
 Falkenbergs BTK, a Swedish table tennis club
 Falkenbergs FF, a Swedish football club
 Falkenbergs Tidning, a former Swedish conservative newspaper
 Falkenbergs VBK, a Swedish volleyball club

In the arts
 Falkenberg Farewell, a 2006 Swedish drama film
 Falkenberg's Legion, a novel in the science fiction compilation The Prince by Jerry Pournelle and S.M. Stirling

Other uses
 Falkenberg (surname), also spelled Falckenberg
 Falkenberg's Restrepia, the common name for Restrepia falkenbergii, an epiphytic orchid

See also
 Falkenburg